Mount Sibayak is a stratovolcano overlooking the town of Berastagi in northern Sumatra, Indonesia. Although its last eruption was more than a century ago, geothermal activity in the form of steam vents and hot springs remains high on and around the volcano. The vents produce crystalline sulfur, which was mined on a small scale in the past. Seepage of sulfurous gases has also caused acidic discolouration of the small crater lake.

Sibayak is a term from the Karo Batak language referring to a founding community. It is relatively easy to climb and has been a tourist attraction since colonial times.

On July 11, 1979, a Fokker F28 operating under Garuda Airlines crashed in Mount Sibayak.

See also 
 List of volcanoes in Indonesia

References

External links 

 Photos of gunung Sibayak and gunung Sinabung

Sibayak
Sibayak
Sibayak
Sibayak
Volcanic crater lakes
Geothermal energy in Indonesia
Landforms of North Sumatra